An acolyte is an assistant or follower assisting the celebrant in a religious service or procession. In many Christian denominations, an acolyte is anyone performing ceremonial duties such as lighting altar candles. In others, the term is used for one who has been inducted into a particular liturgical ministry, even when not performing those duties.

Etymology
The word acolyte is derived from the Greek word ἀκόλουθος (akolouthos), meaning an attendant, via Late Latin acolythus.

Eastern Christianity

In the Eastern Orthodox and Byzantine Catholic churches, the nearest equivalent of acolyte is the altar server. At one time there was a rank of minor clergy called the taper-bearer (κηροφόρος) responsible for bearing lights during processions and liturgical entrances. However, this rank has long ago been subsumed by that of the reader and the service for the tonsure of a reader begins with the setting-aside of a taper-bearer.

The functions of an acolyte or taper-bearer are therefore carried out by readers, subdeacons, or by non-tonsured men or boys who are sometimes called "acolytes" informally. Also, the term "altar-boys" is often used to refer to young altar servers. Subdeacons wear their normal vestments consisting of the sticharion and crossed orarion; readers and servers traditionally wear the sticharion alone.

In recent times, however, in many of the North American Greek Orthodox Churches, for the sake of uniformity, readers have been permitted to wear the orarion (The Bishop presents the reader, who is to serve on the altar, with the orarion). Readers do not cross the orarion while wearing it, the uncrossed orarion being intended to slightly distinguish a reader from a subdeacon.

In the Russian tradition, readers wear only the sticharion, and do not wear the orarion unless they have been specially blessed to by their bishop. (This might be done if a reader must occasionally serve in the role of a subdeacon, or for some other reason the bishop believes is fitting.) If a server has not been tonsured, he must remove the sticharion before he can receive Holy Communion.

Western Christianity

Latin Church

Until 1972, the highest of the four minor orders in the Latin Church was that of acolyte. By his motu proprio Ministeria quaedam of 15 August 1972, Pope Paul VI replaced the term "minor orders" by that of "ministries" and the term "ordination" by "institution". He kept throughout the Latin Church two now-titled instituted ministries, those of reader and acolyte. A prescribed interval, as decided by the Holy See and the national episcopal conference, is to be observed between receiving the two. Candidates for diaconate and for priesthood must receive both ministries and exercise them for some time before receiving holy orders. The two instituted ministries are not reserved solely for candidates for holy orders. Ministries are conferred by the ordinary: either a bishop or the head of a similar territory or, in the case of clerical religious institutes, a major superior. Institutions of acolytes not preparing for holy orders are in fact sometimes carried out.

The motu proprio assigned to the instituted acolyte the functions previously reserved for the subdeacon, and declared national episcopal conferences free to use the term "subdeacon" in place of that of "acolyte". The functions of the instituted acolyte are specified in the motu proprio, and have been indicated also in the General Instruction of the Roman Missal, no. 98, which under the heading, "The Ministry of the Instituted Acolyte and Lector", says: "The acolyte is instituted to serve at the altar and to assist the priest and deacon. In particular, it is his responsibility to prepare the altar and the sacred vessels and, if it is necessary, as an extraordinary minister, to distribute the Eucharist to the faithful. In the ministry of the altar, the acolyte has his own functions (cf. nos. 187-193), which he must perform personally."

The General Instruction of the Roman Missal adds: "In the absence of an instituted acolyte, lay ministers may be deputed to serve at the altar and assist the priest and the deacon; they may carry the cross, the candles, the thurible, the bread, the wine, and the water, and they may also be deputed to distribute Holy Communion as extraordinary ministers." However, some functions, in particular that of cleansing the Eucharistic vessels, are reserved for an instituted acolyte and are not entrusted to those deputed to assist in that way.

As in other churches, in the Latin Church the term "acolyte" is also used of altar servers on whom no ordination or institution has been conferred. Pope Benedict XVI spoke of Saint Tarcisius as "presumably an acolyte, that is, an altar server".

Pope Francis changed canon law in January 2021 to allow female installed acolytes. Prior to his motu proprio Spiritus Domini only men could be installed acolytes.

While the approved English translations of the liturgical books of the Catholic Church's Roman Rite use the term "instituted" (such as "instituted acolytes" and “instituted lectors”) some translations refer to them as “installed”. For example, the translation on the Vatican's website of the 2019 Motu Proprio Aperuit illis – Instituting the Sunday of the Word of God has “Bishops could celebrate the Rite of Installation of Lectors or a similar commissioning of readers …”.

Anglicanism

The order of acolyte was not brought into the Anglican Church during the reformation therefore there is no definition of their role in the Book of Common Prayer 1662. The use of acolytes (like many Anglican practices) is very much dependent on local practice, some parishes may refer to  altar servers are often called acolytes, where as other parishes may have them as a distinctive and formal ministry.  Then in Low or Evangelical Parishes the use of Acolytes or altar servers may not exist at all. Where acolytes are used opinions on gender and age are diverse..

An acolyte can assist in worship by carrying a processional cross, lighting candles, holding the Gospel book, holding candles or "torches", assisting a deacon or priest set up and clean up at the altar, swinging a censer or thurible or carrying the incense boat, handing the offering plates to ushers, and many other tasks as seen fit by the priest or acolyte warden.

Methodism and Lutheranism

In the Methodist and Lutheran traditions, acolytes participate in the worship service by carrying a processional cross or crucifix (these acolytes are called crucifers), lighting and extinguishing the altar candles, and ringing the church bell to call the congregation to worship. In these traditions, the lighting of the altar candles in the worship service is a symbol of Jesus’ coming into the presence of the worshiping community. Before lighting the candles the acolyte may bow at the altar out of respect. Before the extinguishing of the last altar candles, the acolytes relight their "candle lighter" and then process out into the narthex. This symbolizes that Jesus Christ is for all people everywhere. It also symbolizes the light of Jesus Christ going out into the world where believers are called to serve. Similar to those in the Anglican tradition, acolytes in these traditions wear robes called albs, sometimes with a cincture. It is also common for Methodist acolytes to wear the traditional cassock and cotta.

See also

Shganda in Mandaeism

References

John N. Wall. A Dictionary for Episcopalians. Cambridge, MA: Cowley Publications, 2000.

External links

Christian worship roles
Minor orders
Ecclesiastical titles
Catholic liturgy
Mass (liturgy)
Catholic ecclesiastical titles